The Miracle Kid is a 1941 American sports comedy film directed by William Beaudine.

Plot
A young boxer named Jimmy Connley (portrayed by Tom Neal) finds his life turned upside down when he meets with sudden success in the ring.

Cast
Tom Neal as Jimmy Connley
Carol Hughes as Pat Hilton
Vicki Lester as Helen Gibbs
Betty Blythe as Madame Gloria
Ben Taggart as J. Hamilton Gibbs
Alex Callam as Al Bolger
Thornton Edwards as Pedro
Joe Gray as Kayo Kane
Paul Bryar as Rocco
Pat Gleason as Reporter
Billy McGowan as Trigger O'Brien
John Ince as Commissioner
Gene O'Donnell as Usher
Warren Jackson as Headwaiter
Larry McGrath as Referee
Sam Lufkin as Referee
Minta Durfee as Pheney
Gertrude Messinger as Marge
Adele Smith as Lorraine
Frank Otto as Shady

Soundtrack

External links

1941 films
1940s sports comedy-drama films
American boxing films
1940s English-language films
American black-and-white films
Producers Releasing Corporation films
Films directed by William Beaudine
American sports comedy-drama films
1940s American films